Titanio eponyma is a moth in the family Crambidae. It was described by Edward Meyrick in 1890. It is found in Transcaucasia.

References

Moths described in 1890
Odontiini
Taxa named by Edward Meyrick